The 1986–87 Utah Jazz season was the team's 13th in the NBA. They began the season hoping to improve upon their 42–40 output from the previous season. They bested it by two wins, finishing 44–38 and qualified for the playoffs for the fourth straight season.

Draft picks

Roster

Regular season

Season standings

Record vs. opponents

Game log

Regular season

|- align="center" bgcolor="#ffcccc"
| 1
| October 31
| @ Dallas
| L 77–103
|
|
|
| Reunion Arena
| 0–1

|- align="center" bgcolor="#ccffcc"
| 2
| November 1
| Portland
| W 119–110
|
|
|
| Salt Palace
| 1–1
|- align="center" bgcolor="#ccffcc"
| 3
| November 5
| Cleveland
| W 111–95
|
|
|
| Salt Palace
| 2–1
|- align="center" bgcolor="#ffcccc"
| 4
| November 6
| @ Denver
| L 121–135
|
|
|
| McNichols Sports Arena
| 2–2
|- align="center" bgcolor="#ccffcc"
| 5
| November 11
| Dallas
| W 104–103
|
|
|
| Salt Palace
| 3–2
|- align="center" bgcolor="#ccffcc"
| 6
| November 13
| L.A. Clippers
|- align="center" bgcolor="#ccffcc"
| 7
| November 15
| Denver
| W 111–103
|
|
|
| Salt Palace
| 5–2
|- align="center" bgcolor="#ffcccc"
| 8
| November 16
| @ Portland
| L 103–124
|
|
|
| Memorial Coliseum
| 5–3
|- align="center" bgcolor="#ffcccc"
| 9
| November 20
| @ Houston
|- align="center" bgcolor="#ccffcc"
| 10
| November 22
| New Jersey
|- align="center" bgcolor="#ffcccc"
| 11
| November 25
| @ Golden State
|- align="center" bgcolor="#ccffcc"
| 12
| November 26
| Seattle
|- align="center" bgcolor="#ffcccc"
| 13
| November 28
| Atlanta
|- align="center" bgcolor="#ffcccc"
| 14
| November 29
| @ Dallas
| L 107–118
|
|
|
| Reunion Arena
| 7–7

|- align="center" bgcolor="#ccffcc"
| 15
| December 3
| Chicago
|- align="center" bgcolor="#ccffcc"
| 16
| December 5
| New York
|- align="center" bgcolor="#ccffcc"
| 17
| December 6
| @ Sacramento
|- align="center" bgcolor="#ccffcc"
| 18
| December 10
| @ Denver
| W 112–110
|
|
|
| McNichols Sports Arena
| 11–7
|- align="center" bgcolor="#ccffcc"
| 19
| December 11
| Dallas
| W 103–99
|
|
|
| Salt Palace
| 12–7
|- align="center" bgcolor="#ccffcc"
| 20
| December 13
| L.A. Clippers
|- align="center" bgcolor="#ccffcc"
| 21
| December 16
| @ Washington
|- align="center" bgcolor="#ffcccc"
| 22
| December 17
| @ Detroit
|- align="center" bgcolor="#ccffcc"
| 23
| December 19
| @ Cleveland
| W 134–128 (2OT)
|
|
|
| Richfield Coliseum
| 15–8
|- align="center" bgcolor="#ccffcc"
| 24
| December 20
| @ Chicago
|- align="center" bgcolor="#ccffcc"
| 25
| December 22
| @ Philadelphia
|- align="center" bgcolor="#ffcccc"
| 26
| December 23
| @ New Jersey
|- align="center" bgcolor="#ccffcc"
| 27
| December 27
| Houston
|- align="center" bgcolor="#ccffcc"
| 28
| December 29
| San Antonio
|- align="center" bgcolor="#ffcccc"
| 29
| December 30
| @ San Antonio

|- align="center" bgcolor="#ffcccc"
| 30
| January 2
| Philadelphia
|- align="center" bgcolor="#ffcccc"
| 31
| January 4
| @ L.A. Lakers
|- align="center" bgcolor="#ccffcc"
| 32
| January 8
| L.A. Lakers
|- align="center" bgcolor="#ccffcc"
| 33
| January 10
| Indiana
|- align="center" bgcolor="#ffcccc"
| 34
| January 11
| @ Seattle
|- align="center" bgcolor="#ffcccc"
| 35
| January 13
| @ Portland
| L 113–121
|
|
|
| Memorial Coliseum
| 21–14
|- align="center" bgcolor="#ffcccc"
| 36
| January 15
| @ Phoenix
|- align="center" bgcolor="#ffcccc"
| 37
| January 17
| @ San Antonio
|- align="center" bgcolor="#ccffcc"
| 38
| January 21
| Detroit
|- align="center" bgcolor="#ccffcc"
| 39
| January 23
| Golden State
|- align="center" bgcolor="#ffcccc"
| 40
| January 26
| Seattle
|- align="center" bgcolor="#ccffcc"
| 41
| January 27
| @ Houston
|- align="center" bgcolor="#ccffcc"
| 42
| January 29
| Portland
| W 120–114
|
|
|
| Salt Palace
| 25–17
|- align="center" bgcolor="#ffcccc"
| 43
| January 31
| L.A. Clippers

|- align="center" bgcolor="#ccffcc"
| 44
| February 1
| @ Sacramento
|- align="center" bgcolor="#ccffcc"
| 45
| February 3
| Sacramento
|- align="center" bgcolor="#ccffcc"
| 46
| February 5
| @ L.A. Clippers
|- align="center" bgcolor="#ffcccc"
| 47
| February 10
| Phoenix
|- align="center" bgcolor="#ffcccc"
| 48
| February 13
| @ Phoenix
|- align="center" bgcolor="#ccffcc"
| 49
| February 14
| San Antonio
|- align="center" bgcolor="#ccffcc"
| 50
| February 16
| Boston
|- align="center" bgcolor="#ffcccc"
| 51
| February 18
| Milwaukee
|- align="center" bgcolor="#ffcccc"
| 52
| February 20
| Washington
|- align="center" bgcolor="#ffcccc"
| 53
| February 21
| @ Houston
|- align="center" bgcolor="#ccffcc"
| 54
| February 24
| Seattle
|- align="center" bgcolor="#ffcccc"
| 55
| February 26
| Houston
|- align="center" bgcolor="#ccffcc"
| 56
| February 28
| L.A. Lakers

|- align="center" bgcolor="#ffcccc"
| 57
| March 3
| @ New York
|- align="center" bgcolor="#ffcccc"
| 58
| March 4
| @ Boston
|- align="center" bgcolor="#ccffcc"
| 59
| March 6
| @ Milwaukee
|- align="center" bgcolor="#ffcccc"
| 60
| March 7
| @ Atlanta
|- align="center" bgcolor="#ffcccc"
| 61
| March 9
| @ Indiana
|- align="center" bgcolor="#ffcccc"
| 62
| March 11
| @ Denver
| L 116–122
|
|
|
| McNichols Sports Arena
| 33–29
|- align="center" bgcolor="#ccffcc"
| 63
| March 12
| @ Sacramento
|- align="center" bgcolor="#ccffcc"
| 64
| March 14
| Sacramento
|- align="center" bgcolor="#ccffcc"
| 65
| March 17
| Golden State
|- align="center" bgcolor="#ffcccc"
| 66
| March 18
| @ L.A. Lakers
|- align="center" bgcolor="#ccffcc"
| 67
| March 21
| Houston
|- align="center" bgcolor="#ccffcc"
| 68
| March 23
| Denver
| W 122–118
|
|
|
| Salt Palace
| 38–30
|- align="center" bgcolor="#ffcccc"
| 69
| March 25
| @ L.A. Clippers
|- align="center" bgcolor="#ccffcc"
| 70
| March 27
| San Antonio
|- align="center" bgcolor="#ffcccc"
| 71
| March 28
| @ Golden State
|- align="center" bgcolor="#ccffcc"
| 72
| March 31
| Phoenix

|- align="center" bgcolor="#ccffcc"
| 73
| April 1
| @ San Antonio
|- align="center" bgcolor="#ffcccc"
| 74
| April 3
| @ Phoenix
|- align="center" bgcolor="#ffcccc"
| 75
| April 4
| @ Dallas
| L 107–121
|
|
|
| Reunion Arena
| 41–34
|- align="center" bgcolor="#ffcccc"
| 76
| April 6
| Sacramento
|- align="center" bgcolor="#ccffcc"
| 77
| April 8
| Dallas
| W 103–90
|
|
|
| Salt Palace
| 42–35
|- align="center" bgcolor="#ccffcc"
| 78
| April 10
| Denver
| W 106–103
|
|
|
| Salt Palace
| 43–35
|- align="center" bgcolor="#ccffcc"
| 79
| April 12
| @ Golden State
|- align="center" bgcolor="#ffcccc"
| 80
| April 14
| @ Seattle
|- align="center" bgcolor="#ffcccc"
| 81
| April 16
| L.A. Lakers
|- align="center" bgcolor="#ffcccc"
| 82
| April 17
| @ Portland
| L 101–111
|
|
|
| Memorial Coliseum
| 44–38

Playoffs

|-
|- align="center" bgcolor="#ccffcc"
| 1
| April 23
| Golden State
| W 99–95
| Malone, Bailey (20)
| Mark Eaton (15)
| Rickey Green (15)
| Salt Palace11,376
| 1–0
|- align="center" bgcolor="#ccffcc"
| 2
| April 25
| Golden State
| W 103–100
| Darrell Griffith (25)
| Karl Malone (13)
| Hansen, Stockton (5)
| Salt Palace12,095
| 2–0
|- align="center" bgcolor="#ffcccc"
| 3
| April 29
| @ Golden State
| L 95–110
| Kelly Tripucka (16)
| Karl Malone (9)
| John Stockton (8)
| Oakland–Alameda County Coliseum Arena15,025
| 2–1
|- align="center" bgcolor="#ffcccc"
| 4
| May 1
| @ Golden State
| L 94–98
| Hansen, Malone (20)
| Mark Eaton (15)
| John Stockton (11)
| Oakland–Alameda County Coliseum Arena15,025
| 2–2
|- align="center" bgcolor="#ffcccc"
| 5
| May 3
| Golden State
| L 113–118
| Karl Malone (23)
| Mark Eaton (10)
| John Stockton (13)
| Salt Palace11,071
| 2–3
|-

Player statistics

Season

Playoffs

Awards and records
 Mark Eaton, NBA All-Defensive Second Team

Transactions

References

Utah Jazz seasons
Utah
Utah Jazz
Utah Jazz